Bryant O. Johnson (born October 7, 1959 in Washington, D.C.) is an American former handball player who competed in the 1988 Summer Olympics. He is currently the Assistant Director of Solid Waste/General Services for the City of Clearwater, Florida.

References

1959 births
Living people
Sportspeople from Washington, D.C.
American male handball players
Olympic handball players of the United States
Handball players at the 1988 Summer Olympics
Pan American Games bronze medalists for the United States
Medalists at the 1991 Pan American Games
Pan American Games medalists in handball